The Chico Rooks were an American soccer team, founded in 1993 by Dave Stahl and Eric Snedeker. The team was a member of the National Premier Soccer League (NPSL), the fourth tier of the American Soccer Pyramid, until 2006. Initially, the team's management announced that they would spend the 2007 NPSL season on hiatus while they re-organised and consolidated their finances; the Rooks never returned to active competition and the franchise was cancelled by the NPSL at the end of the 2007 season.

The Rooks were a stalwart of the United Soccer Leagues from their formation in 1993 until 2003, where upon they were founding members of the Men's Premier Soccer League (now the National Premier Soccer League). For many years they were California's oldest professional soccer club.

The Rooks played their home matches at the University Stadium on the campus of California State University, Chico in the city of Chico, California. The team's colors were black and white.

Final roster

Year-by-year

Honors
 MPSL Regular Season Champions 2004
 USL PDL Southwest Division Champions 2002
 USL D-3 Pro League Western Division Champions 2000
 USL D-3 Pro League Western Division Champions 1999

Coaches
  David Stahl (1993–2006)

Stadia
 University Soccer Stadium, Chico

Average Attendance
1993: 1,012
1994: 1,181
1995: 1,490
1996: 1,449
1997: 1,933
1998: 1,624
1999: 1,709
2000: 1,710
2001: 2,109
2002: 1,691
2003: 1,656
2004: 1,573

External links
 Chico Rooks (Web Archive)

Soccer clubs in California
National Premier Soccer League teams
Sports in Chico, California
USL Second Division teams
1993 establishments in California
2007 disestablishments in California